William Shirts House, also known as Camperdown Farm, is a historic home in Scottsville in Monroe County, New York. The vernacular Federal-style house was built about 1825. It is composed of a 2-story, four-by-two-bay, main block with a 2-story rear wing.

It was listed on the National Register of Historic Places in 2004.

References

Houses on the National Register of Historic Places in New York (state)
Federal architecture in New York (state)
Houses completed in 1825
Houses in Monroe County, New York
National Register of Historic Places in Monroe County, New York